is a bus transportation company based in Fukui Prefecture, Japan in operation since June 1941. It is a wholly owned subsidiary of Keifuku Electric Railroad, and a part of the Keifuku Group of companies. The company colours are burgundy and taupe.

External links
Keifuku Bus (in Japanese)
Bus-Train Net Fukui (in Japanese)

Transport companies established in 1941
Bus companies of Japan
Companies based in Fukui Prefecture
Japanese companies established in 1941